Bacillidae is a stick insect family in the order Phasmatodea and the suborder Verophasmatodea.

Subfamilies and Genera 
The Phasmida Species File lists:

subfamily Antongiliinae
Auth. Zompro, 2004; distribution: Africa, Madagascar
tribe Antongiliini Zompro, 2004
 Antongilia Redtenbacher, 1906
 Onogastris Redtenbacher, 1906
 Paronogastris Cliquennois, 2006
tribe Leprodini Cliquennois, 2006
 Leprodes Redtenbacher, 1906
 Pseudonogastris Cliquennois, 2006
 Virgasia Cliquennois, 2006
tribe Pseudodatamini Zompro, 2004
 Cirsia Redtenbacher, 1906
 Paracirsia Cliquennois, 2006
 Pseudodatames Redtenbacher, 1906
tribe Tuberculatocharacini Zompro, 2005
 Tuberculatocharax Zompro, 2005
tribe Xylicini Günther, 1953
 Bathycharax Kirby, 1896
 Ocnobius Redtenbacher, 1906
 Ulugurucharax Zompro, 2005
 Xylica Karsch, 1898
 Xylobacillus Uvarov, 1940

subfamily Bacillinae
Auth. Brunner von Wattenwyl, 1893
tribe Bacillini Brunner von Wattenwyl, 1893
 Bacillus Peletier de Saint Fargeau & Serville, 1827
 Clonopsis Pantel, 1915
tribe Phalcini Zompro, 2004
 Phalces Stål, 1875

subfamily Macyniinae 
Auth. Zompro, 2004; endemic to Cape Province
 Macynia (insect) Stål, 1875

References

External links 

Phasmatodea families
Taxa named by Carl Brunner von Wattenwyl